Robert P. Kerr (October 9, 1892 – September 5, 1960) was an American film director, actor and screenwriter. He directed more than 40 films between 1917 and 1928. He was born in Burlington, Colorado and died in Porterville, California from a heart attack.

Filmography

 A Janitor's Wife's Temptation (1915) [Actor]
Bubbles of Trouble (1916) [assistant director]
Black Eyes and Blue (1916) [Director]
His Bread and Butter (1916) [Actor]
His Busted Trust (1916) [assistant director]
A Clever Dummy (1917) [Director]
A Royal Rogue (1917) [Director]
 Dangers of a Bride (1917) [Director]
Hero for a Minute (1917) [Director]
A Flyer in Folly (1918) [Director]
Her Movie Madness (1918) [Director]
The Pickaninny (1921) [Director]
Stop Kidding (1921) [Director]
Sweet By and By (1921) [Director]
Many Happy Returns (1922) [Director]
His First Job (1922) [Director]
Busy Bees (1922) [Director]
 The Handy Man (1923) [Director]
Pest of the Storm Country (1923) [Actor]
Exit Caesar (1923) [Director]
His Sons-in-Law (1924) [Director] [Actor] [Writer]
Hit 'em Hard (1924) [Director] [Writer]
Family Life (1924) [Director]
Keep Coming (1924) [Director] [Writer]
Keep Going (1924) [Director] [Writer]
The Fight (1924) [Writer]
Sons-In-Law (1924) [Director] [Writer]
Obey the Law (1924) [Director] [Writer]
The Big Game Hunter (1925) [Director]
The Guest of Honor (1925) [Director]
The Wrestler (1925) [Director]
The Amateur Detective (1925) [Director]
Honeymoon, Ltd. (1925) [Director]... aka "The Honeymoon Limited" - USA (alternative title)
Control Yourself (1925) [Director]
King Bozo (1926) [Director]
 A Trip to Chinatown (1926) [Director]
The Complete Life (1926) [Director]
The Feud (1926) [Director]
30 Below Zero (1926) [Director]
Andy Nose His Onions (1927) [Director]
Tie That Bull (1927) [Director]
The Mild West (1927) [Director]
Swiss Movements (1927) [Director]
Society Architect (1927) [Director]
Meet the Folks (1927) [Director]
Ocean Blues (1927) [Director]
Greet the Wife (1927) [Director]
Dr. Quack (1927) [Director]
Fighting Fannie (1928) [Director]
They Had to See Paris (1929) [Actor]
The Spider (1931) [Actor]
Island of Lost Souls (1932) [Actor]
The Public Menace (1935) [Actor]
Party Wire (1935) [Actor]
Life Begins at 40 (1935) [Actor]

External links

1892 births
1960 deaths
American male film actors
American male screenwriters
People from Burlington, Colorado
People from Porterville, California
Film directors from California
20th-century American male actors
Film directors from Colorado
Screenwriters from California
Screenwriters from Colorado
20th-century American male writers
20th-century American screenwriters